The National Center for Genomic Analysis (CNAG-CRG, Centre Nacional d'Anàlisi Genòmica in Catalan, Centro Nacional de Análisis Genómico in Spanish) is a genome analysis center in Barcelona that carries out large-scale projects in collaboration with researchers from Catalonia, Spain and the International research community. It has a park of 13 last-generation sequencing systems supported by an outstanding computing infrastructure of 2.6 petabytes of data storage and over 1200 cores of computing, which has enabled the center to build a sequencing capacity of over 800 Gbases/day, the equivalent of completely sequencing eight human genomes every 24 hours. This capacity positions the CNAG as one of the top European centers in terms of sequencing capacity.

It is a non-profit organization founded in 2009 by the Spanish Ministry of Economy and Competitiveness and the Catalan Government through the Economy and Knowledge Department and the Health Department. It is located in the Barcelona Science Park (PCB) that is one of the largest research clusters in Life Sciences in Southern Europe.

The CNAG takes part in large-scale sequencing projects in areas as diverse as cancer genomics, rare disease gene identification, infectious disease genomics, genomics of model organisms, agrogenomics, epigenomics, modeling of the nucleus, comparative genomics and single cell analysis. New laboratory methods, new sequencing methods and data analytical procedures implemented and developed continuously.

The CNAG is certified Illumina CS Pro – Certified Provider and Agilent Exome Sequencing Certified Provider.

Since July 2015 its management was transferred to the Centre for Genomic Regulation (CRG), becoming an outstation of the latter.

References

External links
 CNAG web site
 Parc Cientific de Barcelona web site

Genetics or genomics research institutions
Research institutes in Catalonia